The J/92 is a fixed keel one-design sportsboat.

Design
The J/92 was designed by Rod Johnstone. It was introduced in 1992 by J/Boats who built 150 boats until 2003.

The displacement–length ratio is 132 making it a light displacement boat. The asymmetrical spinnaker is flown from a extendable carbon bowsprit.

Sailing World selected the J/92 as overall "Boat of the Year" in 1993.

Construction
The J/92 was built by Tillotson-Pearson Inc (TPI) in Warren, Rhode Island using a fiberglass sandwich construction of end-grain balsa core. Frames and bulkheads are glassed both to the hull and deck. The keel is seated in epoxy and thru-bolted to the keel stub.

See also 
 J/92s

References

External links

Keelboats
1990s sailboat type designs
Sailboat type designs by Rod Johnstone
Sailboat types built by J/Boats